The Academy of Fine Arts, Munich (also known as Munich Academy) is one of the oldest and most significant art academies in Germany. It is located in the Maxvorstadt district of Munich, in Bavaria, Germany.

History
The history of the academy goes back to the 18th century, before the 1770 founding by Elector Maximilian III. Joseph, the so-called "drawing school", which already bore the name "academy" in its name ("Zeichnungs Schule respective Maler und Bildhauer academie"). The Academy of Fine Arts was enhanced in 1808 by King Maximilian I Joseph of Bavaria as Royal Academy of Fine Arts. 

The Munich School refers to a group of painters who worked in Munich or were trained at the Academy between 1850 and 1918. The paintings are characterized by a naturalistic style and dark chiaroscuro. Typical painting subjects included landscape, portraits, genre, still-life, and history.

From 1900 to 1918 the academy's director was Ferdinand Freiherr von Miller. In 1946, the Royal Academy of Fine Arts was merged with the School of arts and crafts and the School of applied arts. In 1953, its name was changed to the current Academy of Fine Arts.

Buildings

The large 19th-century Renaissance Revival style building complex, designed by Gottfried Neureuther, was completed in 1886. It has housed the Academy since then.

A new Deconstructivist style expansion, designed by the architectural firm Coop Himmelb(l)au as an extension from the original building, was completed in 2005.

The AkademieGalerie (gallery of the academy) is located at the nearby subway station Universität. Since 1989 students could show artworks especially created for this location.

Teaching 
The study at the Academy is organized in class associations. Overall, the Academy accommodates twenty-three classes, led by professors, who each stand for an individual approach to contemporary fine art. These classes are complemented by twenty study workshops and a library, as well as seminars and lectures in art science, philosophy and didactics.

The following study programs are offered:

 Free Art (Diploma)
 Art Education (State Examination and Master Degree)
 Interior Architecture (Bachelor and Master Degree)
 Architecture (Master Degree)
 Art Therapy (Master Degree)

People

Notable professors

 Lawrence Alma-Tadema
 Hermann Anschütz
 Anton Ažbe (1884–1885)
 Nikolaus Gysis
 Peter von Cornelius
 Res Ingold
 Max Klinger
 Franz von Lenbach
 Walter Maurer (1990–2000)
 Robin Page (1981–1998)
 Eduardo Paolozzi (1981–1989)
 Sean Scully
 Jacob Ungerer (1890–1920)
 Arthur von Ramberg
 Gerd Winner (born 1936)

Notable students

 Josef Albers (1919–1920)
 Franz Ackermann (1984–1988)
 Erwin Aichele
 Henry Alexander
 Cuno Amiet (1886–1888)
 Octav Băncilă
 Vladimir Becić
 René Beeh
 Ignat Bednarik
 Claus Bergen
 Robert Julius Beyschlag
 Friedrich Brugger
 Harry Chase
 William Merritt Chase
 Giorgio de Chirico
 Albert Chmielowski
 Susanne Clausen
 Lovis Corinth (1880–1884)
 William Jacob Baer (1880–1884)
 Menci Clement Crnčić
 Thomas Demand
 Samuel Friedrich Diez
 Edgar Downs (1876–1963; silver medallist)
 Frank Duveneck
 Alex Dzigurski (1911–1995)
 Valentin Peter Feuerstein (1917–1999)
 Lothar Fischer (1952–1958)
 Günther Förg
 Wilhelm Heinrich Funk (born 1866), (an American portrait painter)
 Karl Gatermann the Younger
 Herbjørn Gausta
 Dimitrios Geraniotis (1871–1966), Greek portrait painter 
 Aleksander Gierymski (1846–1874)
 Maksymilian Gierymski (1850–1901)
 Louis Grell (1887–1960)
 Rita Grosse-Ruyken (1971–1977)
 Nicholaos Gysis (1842–1901)
 Karl Michael Haider (1846–1912)
 Herman Hartwich (1853–1926)
 Hermann Helmer
 Oskar Herman
 Louis Christian Hess
 Peter von Hess
 Hallgrímur Helgason (born 1959)
 Friedrich Hohe (1802–1870)
 Elmyr de Hory (1906–1976)
 Jörg Immendorff (1984–1985)
 Đorđe Jovanović (sculptor) 
 Wassily Kandinsky (1866–1944)
 Robert Koehler (1873–1875; bronze and silver medalist) 
 Elisaveta Konsulova-Vazova (1881–1965)
 Alfred Kowalski
 Miroslav Kraljević
 Alfred Kubin (1899)
 Paul Klee (1900)
 Wilhelm Leibl
 Maximilian Liebenwein (1869—1926)
 Richard Lindner (1925–1927)
 Melissa Logan
 Ştefan Luchian
 Mahirwan Mamtani (1935)
 Franz Marc (1900–1903)
 Jan Matejko
 Dieter Mathoi (1963–1967)
 János Mattis-Teutsch
 Mato Celestin Medović (1890–1893) 
 Vadim Meller
 Josef Moroder-Lusenberg (1876–1880)
 Alphonse Mucha
 Otto Mueller
 John Mulvany (1839–1906)
 Adolfo Müller-Ury (1881–82)
 Edvard Munch
 Alex Murray-Leslie
 Hubert Netzer (1865–1939)
 Elisabet Ney (1981–1989)
  (1850–1919)
 Charles Henry Niehaus (1855–1935)
 Thomas Satterwhite Noble (1881–83)
 Markus Oehlen (2002–)
 Paul Ondrusch
 Ernst Oppler
 Fritz Osswald
 Ulrike Ottinger (born 1942)
 Bruno Paul
 Carl Theodor von Piloty
 Edward Henry Potthast
 Otto Quante (1875–1947)
 Josip Račić (1905–1908)
 Robert Hermann Raudner (1854–1915) 
 Richard Riemerschmid (1888–1890)
 Léo-Paul Robert (1869)
 Franz Roubaud
 Anna May-Rychter (1864–1955)
 Sep Ruf
 Heinrich Schlitt
 Karl Saltzmann (1896– )
 Barbara Seidenath (born 1960), metalsmith, jeweler.
 Günther Schneider-Siemssen (1926–1915), scenic designer
 Walter Shirlaw
 Edith Soterius von Sachsenheim (1887–1970)
 Karina Smigla-Bobinski
 T. C. Steele
 Vardges Sureniants (1860–1921)
 Johann Gottfried Steffan
 Franz von Stuck
 Nicolae Tonitza
 Axel Törneman (1880–1925)
 John Henry Twachtman
 Petar Ubavkić (1852–1910)
 Spyridon Vikatos (1878–1960) 
 Robert Voit (born 1969)
 Lascăr Vorel
 Alexander von Wagner (1869–1910)
 Henrik Weber (1818–1866)
 Sybilla Mittell Weber (1892–1957)
 Barbara Zeigler, 
 Hans-Peter Zimmer
 Tadeusz Zukotynski (1877–1912)

See also
Munich School and 19th century Greek art
Academic realism — painting style.

References

External links

 
 History of Akademie der Bildenden Künste München 
 Designbuild-network.com Building details of Academy 

 
Universities and colleges in Munich
Maxvorstadt
Culture in Munich
Tourist attractions in Munich
Educational institutions established in 1808
1808 establishments in Bavaria
School buildings completed in 1886
Buildings and structures completed in 2005
Deconstructivism
Coop Himmelblau
Historicist architecture in Munich
Renaissance Revival architecture in Germany